Terra Nova Equipment Ltd based in Clay Cross, Derbyshire was founded in the early 1980s. They make high quality expedition tents which have been used by explorers for expeditions worldwide including to the poles. The best known tent produced by Terra Nova is the Quasar which uses the particularly strong geodesic design.

Not to be confused with Terra Nova agricultural equipment, an Italian company absorbed into Maschio Gaspardo in 1979.

History

Sponsorships
Terra Nova tents sponsored the following expeditions:
Polar Race 2007
Claudwell Xtreme Everest 
Virgin Summits Tibet Expedition 2003

See also 

List of outdoor industry parent companies

References

Manufacturing companies of the United Kingdom
Companies based in Derbyshire